Rust College is a private historically black college in Holly Springs, Mississippi. Founded in 1866, it is the second-oldest private college in the state.  Affiliated with the United Methodist Church, it is one of ten historically black colleges and universities (HBCUs) founded before 1868 that are still operating.

History
One of the oldest colleges for African Americans in the United States, Rust was founded on November 24, 1866, by Northern missionaries with a group called the Freedman's Aid Society of the Methodist Episcopal Church.

In 1892, to avoid confusion with Shaw University in Raleigh, North Carolina, the institution changed its name to Rust University—a tribute to Rev. Richard S. Rust of Cincinnati, Ohio, a preacher, abolitionist, and the secretary of the Freedmen's Aid Society, who helped found the college. In 1915, the institution assumed the name Rust College. Rust College is the oldest of the 11 historically black colleges and universities associated with The United Methodist Church, the second oldest private college in Mississippi.

The college welcomed their new President Ivy Taylor on June 1, 2020.

Academics

Rust College maintains five divisions or departments of study: Division of Education, Division of Humanities, Division of Science and Mathematics, Division of Social Sciences, and the Division of Business.  Degree programs are offered in 16 areas of study.  Upon completion of their studies at Rust, students can receive associates or bachelor's degrees.

Rust College operates on what is called a module system, which is an 8-week semester class system that allows the college to constantly enroll a steady stream of transfer students every 8 weeks.

Campus 
Some buildings on campus were erected in the mid-1800s, such as the alumni and public relations center. Others were recently built, such as the Hamilton Science Center, a three-story addition to the McDonald Science Building. In 2008, Rust College acquired the campus of the former Mississippi Industrial College, located adjacent to the campus.  

In 2011, the college acquired Airliewood, an antebellum former slave plantation estate located near Rust College campus. Built in 1858, Airliewood served as living quarters for Ulysses S. Grant during the Civil War, and currently serves as the official residence of the college president. There are five gender-segregated dorms, with about 900 spaces. Two historic markers honoring the Council of Federated Organizations and those involved in the 1964 Freedom Summer Project in Holly Springs were unveiled on campus in 2014.

Students 
About 70% of students are in a traditional age range of 18 to 21, and 10% are age 25 or older. About 35% of students are from Mississippi, 30% from Tennessee, and 15% from Illinois.

Athletics 
The Rust athletic teams are called the Bearcats. The college is a member of the National Association of Intercollegiate Athletics (NAIA), primarily competing in the Gulf Coast Athletic Conference (GCAC) since the 2018–19 academic year, after spending as an NAIA Independent within the Association of Independent Institutions (AII) during the 2017–18 school year when they joined the NAIA. The Bearcats previously competed in the NCAA Division III ranks as an NCAA D-III Independent until after the 2016–17 school year; and in the Southern Intercollegiate Athletic Conference (SIAC) from 1978–79 to 1987–88, which is currently an NCAA Division II athletic conference.

For certain single sports, the Rust Bearcats softball team competed in the defunct D-III Great South Athletic Conference (GSAC) as an affiliate member from 2013–14 to 2014–15.

Rust competes in 11 intercollegiate varsity sports: Men's sports include baseball, basketball, cross country, tennis and track & field (outdoor); while women's sports include basketball, cross country, softball, tennis, track & field (outdoor) and volleyball.

Accomplishments
In 1984, the women's basketball team won their first national championship with a 51-49 win over Elizabethtown College.

Notable alumni
 Larry Anderson, basketball coach for MIT
 Lucie Campbell (1885–1963), composer, hymnwriter
 Alvin Childress (1907–1986), actor
 Ruby Elzy (1908–1943), operatic soprano
 Perry Wilbon Howard (1877–1961), attorney, assistant U.S. attorney general, Mississippi Republican chairman 
 Leslie B. McLemore (born 1940), civil rights activist, political scientist, interim mayor of Jackson, Mississippi
 Clinton LeSueur (born 1969), journalist, congressional candidate
 Godwin Maduka MD and founder of Las Vegas Pain Institute and Medical Center
 Alexander Preston Shaw (1879–1966), Methodist bishop
 Anita Ward (born 1957), disco singer
 Ida B. Wells (1862–1931), newspaper editor, activist, cofounder of the NAACP
 Willie Mitchell (1928–2010), record executive, musician, producer
Susie Revels Cayton (1870-1943), activist, journalist, editor, writer

See also

 WURC Rust College's public radio station

References

Further reading
 Robinson, Marco Tyrone, "'By Their Fruits Ye Shall Know Them': Civil Rights Activism at Rust College and in Marshall Country, 1957–1964" (PhD dissertation, University of Mississippi, 2010). DA3447108.

External links
 Official website
 Official athletics website

 
Historically black universities and colleges in the United States
Liberal arts colleges in Mississippi
Educational institutions established in 1866
Universities and colleges accredited by the Southern Association of Colleges and Schools
Education in Marshall County, Mississippi
Buildings and structures in Holly Springs, Mississippi
1866 establishments in Mississippi
Private universities and colleges in Mississippi